The military ranks of Spain are the military insignia used by the Spanish Armed Forces.

Army

Commissioned officer ranks
The rank insignia of commissioned officers.

Other ranks
The rank insignia of non-commissioned officers and enlisted personnel.

Non commissioned officers and Enlisted Student rank insignia

Navy

Commissioned officer ranks
The rank insignia of commissioned officers.

Other ranks
The rank insignia of non-commissioned officers and enlisted personnel.

Officer Cadets and NCO Candidates

Air and Space Force

Commissioned officer ranks
The rank insignia of commissioned officers.

Other ranks
The rank insignia of non-commissioned officers and enlisted personnel.

Non commissioned officers and Enlisted Student rank insignia

Guardia Civil

Commissioned officer ranks
The rank insignia of commissioned officers.

Other ranks
The rank insignia of non-commissioned officers and enlisted personnel.

Non commissioned officers and Enlisted Student rank insignia

Common Corps

Commissioned officer ranks
The rank insignia of commissioned officers.

Spanish Royal Guard

Commissioned officer ranks
The rank insignia of commissioned officers.

Other ranks
The rank insignia of non-commissioned officers and enlisted personnel.

Military Emergencies Unit

Commissioned officer ranks
The rank insignia of commissioned officers.

Other ranks
The rank insignia of non-commissioned officers and enlisted personnel.

See also 
 Ranks of the Spanish Republican Army
 Ranks of the Spanish Republican Navy
 Ranks of the Spanish Republican Air Force

References

External links
 

Spain
Military of Spain